Burbure is a commune in the Pas-de-Calais department in the Hauts-de-France region in northern France.

Geography

Population

Sights
 The Church of St. Gervais and Protais, dating from the fifteenth century, was expanded and renovated in 1870.
 The Commonwealth War Graves Commission cemetery.
 The war memorial.

See also
Communes of the Pas-de-Calais department

References

External links

 The CWGC graves in the Burbure communal cemetery

Communes of Pas-de-Calais